A penetrating atherosclerotic ulcer (PAU) is an atherosclerotic lesion that ulcerates, leading to a hematoma forming within the walls of the aorta.

Cause

Diagnosis
The condition is often associated with thickening of the aortic wall, and can be differentiated from similar conditions (atherosclerotic plaque and a thrombus) through the use of computed tomography and magnetic resonance imaging, though the latter is superior. Transesophageal echocardiography and intravascular ultrasonography may also be used in differentiation.

Treatment
Complications such as rupture or other life-threatening conditions are rare.  Treatment may involve surgery, particularly when signs indicating worsening are present (the patient is unable to control their pain or changes in blood pressure).

Notes

External links

Diseases of the aorta
Diseases of arteries, arterioles and capillaries